Solopharm (Grotex OOO) – Russian pharmaceutical company, which produces liquid sterile dosage forms according to GMP standards (license № 00023-LS). 
Product line consists of infusion and injection solutions, ophthalmic, otolaryngological, gastroenterological, rheumatological and cosmetological products.

History 

Solopharm company was established in 2010. 
The owner and director of Solopharm company is Russian businessman Oleg Zherebtsov. In August 2014 – launch of injection and infusion solution lines by the innovative technology Blow-Fill-Seal accepted in the world as the most perfect technology for production of sterile solutions with opportunity to use aseptic filling or finish sterilization. 
Solopharm company continues building and assembling new lines to increase the amount of liquid medicines in ophthalmology, otolaryngology, gastroenterology, rheumatology and cosmetology.

Activity 

The company activity is directed to development and production of:
Products in polyethylene and polypropylene packaging
Generics in different therapeutic areas
Own brands of drugs and medical products

Product Lines 

Ophthalmology
Rheumatology
Otolaryngology
Pulmonology
Cosmetology
Gastroenterology
Injection solutions
Infusion solutions

References

External links 

Solopharm website

Pharmaceutical companies of Russia
Pharmaceutical companies established in 2010
2010 establishments in Russia